John Wicktor Eke (12 March 1886 – 11 June 1964) was a Swedish long-distance runner who competed at the 1912 Stockholm Olympics. He won a bronze medal in the individual cross country and a gold in the team cross country event. Eke also progressed to the 10000 m final, but decided to withdraw.

After his 1912 Olympic victory, Eke moved to New York City, where he competed for the Irish American Athletic Club.

References

External links

profile
Winged Fist Organization

1886 births
1964 deaths
Swedish male long-distance runners
Olympic athletes of Sweden
Athletes (track and field) at the 1912 Summer Olympics
Olympic gold medalists for Sweden
Olympic bronze medalists for Sweden
Medalists at the 1912 Summer Olympics
Olympic gold medalists in athletics (track and field)
Olympic bronze medalists in athletics (track and field)
Olympic cross country runners
19th-century Swedish people
20th-century Swedish people